Paul Lamb (born 12 September 1974) was an English footballer. His last club was  Daventry Town, who he agreed to become player/coach of in the 2009 off season and stayed there until 2011, when he became Assistant Manager at Banbury United F.C.

Lamb was born in Plumstead, London and began his career as a trainee with Northampton Town, making three league appearances in the 1991–92 season whilst still a trainee. Paul is now a physical education teacher at Malcolm Arnold Academy in Northampton.

After being released by Northampton he joined non-league Dunstable, subsequently playing for Buckingham Town (twice), Bedworth United  and Wealdstone before joining Boreham Wood in December 2001. He moved to Hemel Hempstead Town in July 2002 and to Brackley Town in the 2003 close season before joining Aylesbury United in June 2004.

In July 2005 Lamb joined Banbury United, before re-joining Bedworth United and moving a few places down the Football pyramid to  Daventry Town, citing his advancing years as one of the reasons he made the move. In 2011, he joined Banbury United as Assistant Manager, working with Ady Fuller. He is currently Assistant Manager to Andy Peaks at AFC Rushden & Diamonds.

References

1974 births
Living people
Footballers from Plumstead
English footballers
Northampton Town F.C. players
Dunstable Town F.C. players
Buckingham Town F.C. players
Bedworth United F.C. players
Wealdstone F.C. players
Boreham Wood F.C. players
Hemel Hempstead Town F.C. players
Brackley Town F.C. players
Aylesbury United F.C. players
Banbury United F.C. players
Daventry Town F.C. players
English Football League players
Association football midfielders